The mountain chiffchaff or eastern chiffchaff (Phylloscopus sindianus) is a species of leaf warbler found in the Caucasus (P. s. lorenzii) and Himalayas (P. s. sindianus), and is an altitudinal migrant, moving to lower levels in winter. The nominate subspecies is similar to the Siberian chiffchaff, but with a finer darker bill, browner upperparts and buff flanks; its song is almost identical to the common chiffchaff, but the call is a weak psew. P. s. lorenzii is warmer and darker brown than the nominate race; it is sympatric with common chiffchaff in a small area in the Western Caucasus, but interbreeding occurs rarely, if ever. The mountain chiffchaff differs from tristis in vocalisations, external morphology and mtDNA sequences. Its two subspecies appear to be distinct vocally, and also show some difference in mtDNA sequences.

References

(German) Martens, Jochen (1982): Ringförmige Arealüberschneidung und Artbildung beim Zilpzalp, Phylloscopus collybita. Das lorenzii-Problem. Zeitschrift für Zoologische Systematik und Evolutionsforschung 20: 82–100.
German) Martens, Jochen; Hänel, Sabine (1981): Gesangformen und Verwandtschaft der asiatischen Zilpzalpe Phylloscopus collybita abietinus und Ph. c. sindianus. Journal für Ornithologie 122 (4): 403–427. [with English abstract] doi:10.1007/BF01652928
Sangster, George; Knox, Alan G.; Helbig, Andreas J.; Parkin, David T. (2002). "Taxonomic recommendations for European birds". Ibis 144 (1): 153–159. doi:10.1046/j.0019-1019.2001.00026.x. https://doi.org/10.1046/j.0019-1019.2001.00026.x
Helbig, Andreas J.; Martens, Jochen; Seibold, I.; Henning, F.; Schottler, B; Wink, Michael (1996). "Phylogeny and species limits in the Palearctic Chiffchaff Phylloscopus collybita complex: mitochondrial genetic differentiation and bioacoustic evidence". Ibis 138 (4): 650–666. http://www.uni-heidelberg.de/institute/fak14/ipmb/phazb/pubwink/1996/13_1996.pdf.

mountain chiffchaff
Birds of Azerbaijan
Birds of Central Asia
Birds of North India
Birds of Western China
mountain chiffchaff